Joseph Kennedy (born Joseph Wilson, 1 November 1981 in Oxford) is an actor, singer and musician.

Early life and education
Joseph was born to the actor John Bowe. He was a student at Dragon School and then Abingdon School from 1995–2000 where he appeared in the productions Jesus Christ Superstar and Sweeney Todd. After having obtained the equivalent of a bachelor's degree in France, he joined the Central School of Speech and Drama in London.

Acting
In 2008 he played the role of the assassin Carter, in the British television programme TV series Robin Hood, the character Carter was killed by the Sheriff of Nottingham at the end of season 2 in episode 13. Episode 8 "Get Carter!" was named after his character.

More recently he appeared in the films The Incident and The Grind, and in 2014 played the character Will Scarlet in the Doctor Who episode "Robot of Sherwood".

In 2016 he appeared in Brimstone, directed by Martin Koolhoven.

Solomon Grey
Kennedy co-created a band called Captive State in London, alongside Tom Bootle, before forming a band with Tom Kingston called Solomon Grey, which was signed by Mercury KX in 2015.

In 2017 Solomon Grey created the music for the BBC drama The Last Post and The Casual Vacancy, a TV adaptation of JK Rowling's novel.

He is also involved in the project Bess who did one of the songs for Back to Life, another series for which Solomon Grey provided the music.

Career

Filmography
2006: Housewife, 49 (TV film): James Wenchurch
2006: Where the Heart Is: Johnny (TV, 1 episode)
2006: Do not Look Back in Anger (TV, 2 episodes) Johnny
2006: Midsomer Murders: Roland Marwood (TV, 1 episode)
2006: Four Funerals and a Wedding (TV): Roland Marwood
2006: Bobby Moore (Telefilm): Bobby Moore (Lead)
2008: Robin Hood: Carter (TV, 2 episodes)
2009: Trial & Retribution: Sebastian (TV, 1 episode)
2009 Siren (Part 1); (TV): Sebastian
2010: Baseline (film): Jack
2010: Sex & Drugs & Rock & Roll (film): Davey Payne
2011: Women in Love (TV series) (TV, 1 episode, season 1): Anton Skrebensky
2011: The Grind (film): Barry
2011: The Incident (film): Ricky
2012: Gozo (film): Joe
2012: Subculture (film): Darryl
2014: Doctor Who: Will Scarlet (TV, 1 episode)
2016: Brimstone by Martin Koolhoven

Theatre
2004: Twelfth Night; Sebastian
2005: Julius Caesar
2007: Europe
2008: Riflemind

See also
 List of Old Abingdonians

References

1981 births
Male actors from Oxfordshire
People educated at Abingdon School
Living people